Pashalu may refer to:

Pashalu, Iran
the former name for Zaritap, Armenia